Cyril Paglino (born 1986) is a French breakdancer, reality TV personality and IT entrepreneur who has founded and invested in several startup companies.

Business career 
Paglino founded the digital communication agency, Wizee in 2011. Later in 2013, he sold it to Change Group. He also co-founded Pleek, a picture messaging application that allows its users to communicate via images.

Paglino has invested in 30 technology startups to date. In 2015, he founded Tribe, a video messaging app, backed by investments from Sequoia Capital and KPCB.

Entertainment career 
Paglino worked in the breakdance band Legiteam Obstruxion and was crowned champion of France in 2006, 2007 and 2008.  He won the world title in 2007. He is a former vice-world champion of breakdancing.

Paglino was a cast member on reality TV show Secret Story 2, playing alongside Alexandra.

References 

21st-century French businesspeople
Participants in French reality television series
1986 births
Living people